Sreekrishnapurathe Nakshathrathilakkam is a 1998 Indian Malayalam-language comedy drama film, directed by Rajasenan. It is a remake of the Tamil film Bama Vijayam (1967). The film features Innocent, Jagathy Sreekumar, Cochin Haneefa, Oduvil Unnikrishnan, K. P. A. C. Lalitha, Kalaranjini, Bindu Panicker and Nagma in her debut malayalam film, although her previous Malayalam film, “Anna” was officially unreleased to date. It was produced by Highness Arts and was distributed by Kavyachandrika Release. The story and screenplay of the movie were designed by Mani Shornur, to which Rajan Kizhakkanela added the dialogues.

Plot 

The plot revolves around the life in a typical, Malayali household named Shanthi Nilayam - consisting of four brothers; Nandakumar - a Hindi teacher in the local school , Krishnakumar - a court office clerk,  Gopakumar  - a medical representative and Chandrakumar - a college student , in order of their age. The first three brothers are married to - Kausalya, Anandam and Indumathi, three naive, and shallow wives who adore their husbands dearly and whom the husbands equally love. The family is headed by their father, Munshi Parameshwaran Pillai, a veteran Gandhian teacher respected by everyone in their village, who also home schools his grandchildren. The youngest brother Chandrakumar is in love with his to-be engaged fiancée, Asha, his cousin. Their relationship is oppressed by the family members because of a small feud between them. But otherwise, the household is a happy, peaceful and satisfied one until the arrival of their new neighbor - an irresistibly charming and beautiful South Indian film heroine - Yamuna Rani. This turns the household upside down and sends the ladies into a frenzy. The ladies, in order to please the superstar, glamourise themselves, their husbands and the house. Thus, they form a formidable friendship with Yamuna Rani. Soon, trouble starts to brew when the loan with which they bought their new household items in order to impress Yamuna Rani needs to be paid back to the moneylender. The trouble further escalates when the ladies, each, receive a letter from an anonymous identity, which claims that one of the three men are having an extramarital affair with Yamuna Rani.

With the arrival of the letter, which devastates the ladies, chaos ensues. The husbands are under severe under pressure from their respective wives, who are trying to find out who that one person is. The distraught wives go to Yamuna Rani and plead, which leads her to attempt suicide. Thus the husbands are taken into custody by the local police on account of traumatising Yamuna Rani. Later it is revealed that it was Munshi Parameshwaran Pilla himself, who sent the letter to the ladies to end their modus operandi. Yamuna Rani recovers later and testifies that it was not because of the husbands, but due to her foster mother Santhanavalli who was pressuring her of act inappropriately in a certain movie, that led her to attempt suicide. In the end all's well - Yamuni Rani heading back to her illustrious career taking with her the love and affection shown by the members of Shanthi Nilayam.

Cast

Soundtrack 
The film's soundtrack contains 3 songs, all composed by Berny Ignatius, with lyrics by S. Ramesan Nair. BGM for the movie was done by S. P. Venkatesh.

References

External links 
 
 Sreekrishnapurathe Nakshathrathilakkam – MalayalaSangeetham.info

1998 films
1990s Malayalam-language films
Indian comedy films
Malayalam remakes of Tamil films
Films scored by Berny–Ignatius
Films directed by Rajasenan
1998 comedy films